Campion may refer to:

Biology
 Campions, flowering plants in the genus Silene (carnation family, Caryophyllaceae), including:
 Silene acaulis, moss campion
 Silene coronaria rose campion
 Silene dioica, red campion
 Silene latifolia, white campion
 Silene tomentosa, Gibraltar campion
 Silene vulgaris, bladder campion
 Silene stenophylla, narrow-leafed campion
 Silene villosa, desert campion
 Sideridis rivularis, the campion, a moth of Europe and Asia
 Campion (lacewing), a genus of mantidfly in subfamily Mantispinae of family Mantispidae

Education
Campion College, Old Toongabbie, Australia
Campion College, Kingston, Jamaica
Campion College (Regina, Canada)
Campion College, Gisborne
Campion House College, Osterley, London
Campion Hall, Oxford
Campion School (disambiguation) (several)

Fiction
Albert Campion, a fictional detective created by English author Margery Allingham
Campion Bond, a minor character in the comic versions of The League of Extraordinary Gentlemen
Campion (Watership Down), a rabbit from the novel Watership Down by Richard Adams
A protagonists of the Alastair Reynolds novel House of Suns
A character in the HBO Max show Raised By Wolves

People 

 Edmund Campion (1540–1581) English Catholic Jesuit priest and martyr

Places
Campion, Western Australia
Campion Air Force Station, Alaska, United States
Campion, Colorado, United States

Other uses
Campion (surname)
Campion (1989 TV series), a BBC television series (1989-1990)
Campion (1959 TV series), a British mystery television series (1959-1960)
Campion Cycle Company, a British maker of cycles, motorcycles and cars between 1901 and 1926